Qorağan (also, Goragan, Karagan, and Koragan) is a village and municipality in the Qakh Rayon of Azerbaijan.  It has a population of 1262.

References 

Populated places in Qakh District